42 Cowles Road is a heritage-listed historic residence located at 42 Cowles Road, Mosman in the Mosman Council local government area of New South Wales, Australia. The house is also known as Shadwell. It was added to the New South Wales State Heritage Register on 2 April 1999.

History

Description
Located behind high hedges and picket fences, this unique, light-filled family home with traditional corrugated iron roofing, bull-nosed return verandah and iron-lace embellishments. Perfectly private, surrounded by country-cottage plantings of roses and gardenias, creating a serene and appealing setting. The house is unspoilt, retaining its history and meticulously presented with wide entry, high ceilings, original polished floors and fireplaces.

Heritage listing 
42 Cowles Road, Mosman was listed on the New South Wales State Heritage Register on 2 April 1999.

See also 

Australian residential architectural styles

References

Attribution 

New South Wales State Heritage Register
Houses in Mosman, New South Wales
Articles incorporating text from the New South Wales State Heritage Register
Houses completed in 1890
1890 establishments in Australia